In the Mix may refer to:

 In the Mix (film), a film starring Usher
 In the Mix (TV series), an American program for teenagers
 The Best of 10 Years – 32 Superhits, a 1986 album by Boney M. re-released in 2008 as In the Mix
 In the Mix (album), a 1994 album by pianist John Hicks, or the title track
 "In the Mix" (Mariah Carey song), the theme song of the American sitcom Mixed-ish

See also
 B in the Mix: The Remixes, an album by Britney Spears
 In da Mix, a 1999 album by Blank & Jones
 In de mix, a Belgian Flemish music television series